Pietro Pegollo (born 27 May 1993), is an Italian professional footballer who plays as a forward for Camaiore.

Career
Ahead of the 2019/20 season, Pegollo joined Camaiore Calcio ASD.

References

External links

1993 births
Living people
Italian expatriate footballers
Italian footballers
Association football forwards
Carrarese Calcio players
U.S. Massese 1919 players
Dalry Thistle F.C. players
Serie D players
Italian expatriate sportspeople in Scotland
Italian expatriate sportspeople in Australia
Expatriate footballers in Scotland
Expatriate soccer players in Australia